Shalrie Jamal Joseph (born May 24, 1978) is a Grenadian former professional footballer who is currently a coach with the New England Revolution organization.

Youth and College
Joseph moved to Brooklyn, New York with his family as a teenager. He played college soccer at Bryant & Stratton College and St. John's University, New York, graduating in 2002.

Playing career

Professional

New England
Joseph was drafted fourteenth overall in the 2002 MLS SuperDraft by the New England Revolution, but did not join the team until the 2003 season, having spent much of 2002 searching for a club overseas and later playing for the New York Freedom of USL D-3 Pro League. Upon joining the Revolution, Joseph quickly proved himself to be one of the most talented defensive midfielders in the league. He was named to the MLS Best XI in 2005.

In August 2006, Joseph had a $1 million offer from Celtic F.C., but MLS rejected the offer. In January 2007, another offer of $2 million from Celtic was also rejected by MLS.

In 2008, he started and played the entire MLS All-Star Game versus West Ham United. The All-stars won that game 3–2, making them 5–0 all time against foreign teams.

He became the Revolution's captain in 2010 after previous captain Steve Ralston left the Revolution to join AC St. Louis. Later in 2010, Joseph took a leave of absence from the team while he was involved in the Major League Soccer substance abuse and behavioral health program. Joseph returned to the Revolution at the end of May.

The Revolution signed Joseph to a Designated Player contract for the 2012 season.

Later career
On August 1, 2012, Joseph was traded to Chivas USA in exchange for Blair Gavin, a second round pick in the 2013 MLS SuperDraft, and allocation money.

On February 19, 2013, Joseph was traded to Seattle Sounders FC along with second round picks in the 2014 MLS SuperDraft and 2015 MLS SuperDraft, and a swap in allocation order.

In April 2014, Joseph rejoined the New England Revolution.

On May 21, 2016, Joseph signed up to play with Premier Development League side FC Boston.

International
Joseph was a member of the Grenada national team, for whom he has played for in the Caribbean Cup, the 2009 CONCACAF Gold Cup, and World Cup qualifiers.

Coaching
Joseph became head coach of Grenada national football team in March 2018.
In March 2020, Joseph returned to the United States and joined his former club the New England Revolution in a coaching role.

Personal
Joseph earned his U.S. citizenship in 2009.

Honors

New England Revolution
North American SuperLiga (1): 2008
Lamar Hunt U.S. Open Cup (1): 2007

Individual
MLS Best XI: 2005, 2007, 2008, 2009

References

External links

1978 births
Living people
Grenadian footballers
Grenadian expatriate footballers
New York Freedom players
New England Revolution players
Chivas USA players
Seattle Sounders FC players
FC Boston players
Grenada international footballers
St. John's Red Storm men's soccer players
2009 CONCACAF Gold Cup players
2011 CONCACAF Gold Cup players
People from St. George's, Grenada
Expatriate soccer players in the United States
USL Second Division players
Major League Soccer players
Major League Soccer All-Stars
Designated Players (MLS)
USL League Two players
Grenadian emigrants to the United States
New England Revolution draft picks
Association football midfielders
Bryant and Stratton College alumni
New England Revolution non-playing staff